James Renwick may refer to:
Jim Renwick (born 1952), Scottish rugby player
Jim Renwick (politician) (1917–1984), politician in Ontario, Canada
James Renwick (climate scientist), weather and climate researcher
James Renwick (Covenanter) (1662–1688), Scottish Covenanter
James Renwick (physicist) (1790–1863), English-American scientist and engineer
James Renwick Jr. (1818–1895), American architect, son of the physicist
James Renwick (Iowa politician), mayor of Davenport, 1869